Tyler Jacobson is an American science fiction and fantasy artist and illustrator.

Career
His work has been featured in publications by Wizards of the Coast, Simon & Schuster, TOR, Entertainment Weekly, Rolling Stone, Texas Monthly, Men’s Journal, Runner's World, The Weekly Standard, and Scientific American.

Jacobson is best known as a fantasy artist, due to his significant contributions of art to Magic: The Gathering trading card game cards, package art, and promotional materials, as well as character design and game art for Dungeons & Dragons. Jacobson designed the standard edition cover for the 5th edition Dungeons & Dragons adventure module The Wild Beyond the Witchlight (2021). SyFy Wire highlighted that "the cover for The Wild Beyond the Witchlight promises an ominous carnival atmosphere with a creepy clown and a looming, imposing-looking enforcer-type character".

He is also known as a mainstream artist for contributions to several popular publications, including the oil painting Last Days of The Comanches featured in Texas Monthly.

Education
Jacobson graduated from Gonzaga University in 2005 with a BA in Fine Art, and from the Academy of Art University in San Francisco in 2009 with a MFA in Illustration and was awarded Best of Show MFA Traditional Illustration AAU Spring Show 2009, and First Place MFA Traditional Illustration AAU Spring Show 2009.

Awards
 2010 Jack Gaughan Award for Best Emerging Artist
 2012 Spectrum 19 Gold Winner: Advertising for Talon of Umberlee.

Notes

External links 
 
 Magic Cards by Tyler Jacobson
 
 

Artists from Washington (state)
Living people
People from Alameda, California
People from Olympia, Washington
Role-playing game artists
Year of birth missing (living people)